Svaliava (Svalyave) is a city located on the Latorytsia River in Zakarpattia Oblast in western Ukraine. It is the administrative center of Svaliava Raion (district). Population: .

Names

Demographics
At the 2001 census, the population included:
 Ukrainians (94.5%)
 Russians (1.5%)
 Hungarians (0.7%)
 Slovaks (0.6%)

History
Swaljawa was first mentioned in the 12th century as a small settlement of a Hungarian feudal lord. In the 18th century, the village was annexed to the Austro-Hungarian Monarchy and was called Schwalbach. These lands later passed to the Count of Schönborn and his descendants. Gradually, Swaljawa became a multinational town with a significant part of the population being ethnic Germans.

According to the census of 1910, 47.1%  of the population was Greek Catholic, 26.2% Jewish and 22.9% Roman Catholic. The Jewish population was deported to Auschwitz after the German occupation of Hungary, in May 1944, and most of them was murdered there.

After the Second World War a concentration camp was working near the town. Hungarian and German-born civilians (born between 1896 and 1926) were carried off by Soviet forces to the camp purely on the basis of their nationality. They were ordered to report for "malenkij robot" (a corrupted Russian for "small work"), but most of them – more than 10 thousands deportees were killed in the camp. The site of the camp is now a memorial park established in 1994.

Gallery

References

External links
 Svaliava in the Encyclopedia of Ukraine

Cities in Zakarpattia Oblast
Spa towns in Ukraine
Cities of district significance in Ukraine
Holocaust locations in Ukraine